This is a list of the 25 members of the European Parliament for Belgium in the 1994 to 1999 session.

List

1994
List
Belgium